Women & Songs: Beginnings is the first of an eventual two releases in the Women & Songs "Beginnings" series.

Overview 
The album was released on November 30, 1999, the same day as Women & Songs 3.  The album chronicles 31 tracks from popular female artists which helped launch successful careers for those artists.  This is also the first two-disc collection issued in the franchise.

Aretha Franklin, who makes another appearance on the later Beginnings album, shows up here with her classic Respect.  Bette Midler also appears singing The Rose from the soundtrack for the movie of the same name.  Also on the first disc is Midnight Train to Georgia by Gladys Knight & the Pips.  Patsy Cline contributes Walkin' After Midnight while My Guy appears courtesy of Mary Wells.  Etta James puts in an early appearance on the second disc with At Last, while two of the best tracks on the entire collection finish things off: first Dolly Parton with the heartwarming I Will Always Love You followed by the classic Judy Garland hit Over the Rainbow.

Track listing

Disc 1 
 God Bless the Child [4:00]
(performed by Billie Holiday)
 What a Diff'rence a Day Made [2:31]
(performed by Dinah Washington)
 Fever [3:22]
(performed by Peggy Lee)
 Son of a Preacher Man [2:27]
(performed by Dusty Springfield)
 Respect [2:26]
(performed by Aretha Franklin)
 Downtown [3:11]
(performed by Petula Clark)
 Walkin' After Midnight [2:01]
(performed by Patsy Cline)
 Ode to Billie Joe [4:16]
(performed by Bobbie Gentry)
 Put a Little Love in Your Heart [2:35]
(performed by Jackie DeShannon)
 Midnight Train to Georgia [4:40]
(performed by Gladys Knight & The Pips)
 Let's Call the Whole Thing Off [4:30]
(performed by Ella Fitzgerald)
 My Guy [2:53]
(performed by Mary Wells)
 You're So Vain [4:20]
(performed by Carly Simon)
 The Rose [3:33]
(performed by Bette Midler)
 Me and Bobby McGee [4:30]
(performed by Janis Joplin)

Disc 2 
 I Feel the Earth Move [3:00]
(performed by Carole King)
 Lotta Love [3:09]
(performed by Nicolette Larson)
 At Last [3:02]
(performed by Etta James)
 Chuck E's in Love [3:31]
(performed by Rickie Lee Jones)
 Just One Look [2:32]
(performed by Doris Troy)
 So Long [2:39]
(performed by Ruth Brown)
 Baby I'm Yours [2:32]
(performed by Barbara Lewis)
 I'll Never Fall in Love Again [3:03]
(performed by Dionne Warwick)
 Midnight at the Oasis [3:47]
(performed by Maria Muldaur)
 Reflections [2:53]
(performed by The Supremes)
 Misty [3:02]
(performed by Sarah Vaughan)
 Midnight Blue [3:55]
(performed by Melissa Manchester)
 Blue Bayou [3:55]
(performed by Linda Ronstadt)
 Both Sides Now [3:16]
(performed by Judy Collins)
 I Will Always Love You [3:07]
(performed by Dolly Parton)
 Over the Rainbow [3:30]
(performed by Judy Garland)

References 
 [ Women & Songs: Beginnings at AllMusic]

2001 compilation albums